The Michigan State Police (MSP) is the state police agency for the U.S. state of Michigan. The MSP is a full-service law enforcement agency, with its sworn members having full police powers statewide.

The department was founded in 1917 as a wartime constabulary (originally named the Michigan State Troops Permanent Force) and eventually evolved into the modern agency that it is today. The department's entry-level members are called "Recruits", who eventually earn the title of "Trooper". Its headquarters is in Dimondale, Michigan.

History
The Michigan Department of State Police began as a temporary, wartime emergency force for the purpose of domestic security during World War I. On April 19, 1917, Governor Albert Sleeper created the Michigan State Troops Permanent Force, also known as the Michigan State Constabulary. With Colonel Roy C. Vandercook as the first commanding officer, this new force consisted of five Troops of mounted, dismounted and motorized units, totaling 300 men. With Michigan going "dry", enacting state liquor prohibition effective May 1, 1918, and Ohio "wet", the force was soon stationed in Monroe County by 1918 due to the smuggling going on. On March 26, 1919, Public Act 26 reorganized the Constabulary as the permanent, peacetime Michigan State Police.

Throughout the history of the department, its members have participated in many important events. Some of the earliest duties of the department involved its troopers being dispatched on horseback to the iron-rich regions of the state's Upper Peninsula to guarantee the mining and distribution of the vital ore.

A Bureau of Investigation and Identification was started by Capt. Ira H. Marmon opened in 1919 at the East Lansing Headquarters with an old shoebox fingerprint records file previous kept under his barracks cot next to his desk.

In the mid-1970s Michigan Governor William Milliken gave the Michigan State Police a permanent presence on Detroit area freeways which culminated in the opening of the Detroit Freeway post in Downtown Detroit. This action was taken after a rash of crimes on the Detroit area freeway system and local law enforcement had limited resources in doing expressway patrols on a regular basis. MSP troopers were deployed in Benton Harbor in the summer of 2003 to quell civil unrest that was occurring within that city.

Troopers were also deployed to Louisiana in September 2005 following Hurricane Katrina to assist local authorities with search and rescue, law enforcement, and humanitarian efforts in the devastated city of New Orleans, Louisiana. In January and February 2006, the Michigan State Police deployed several hundred Troopers to Detroit during Super Bowl XL and worked with local and federal agencies to ensure a safe environment for the game and its related festivities.

The summers of 1987 and 2007 saw a major mobilization of departmental resources for the National Governors' Conference in Traverse City. The state police were also requested to assist local police agencies with patrol support in the cities of Flint and Saginaw; a similar request was made in February 2008 by the city of Pontiac after budget difficulties forced the cash-strapped city to lay off many police officers.

In 2017, the MSP went from the garrison style cap to a navy blue straw "Smokey" campaign hat as part of their uniform. In July 2018, the MSP switched back to the garrison style cap after most troopers voted to switch back to the old hat.

2011 Redistricting

On October 1, 2011, in an effort to achieve its $17.7 million general fund reduction for fiscal year 2012, the department's districts were realigned and the number of posts was reduced from 62 to 29. In total, 18 posts were converted to detachments (private auxiliary offices for other posts) and 14 posts were closed; however, no MSP employees were laid off. The number of posts increased to 30 in December 2016, when the Metro South post reopened in Taylor, a suburb of Detroit.

Duties
Troopers with the Michigan State Police are entrusted with the authority to conduct investigations concerning violations of criminal and traffic statutes throughout the state and answer service calls regardless of city, township, or county boundaries.

Department Overview

The Michigan State Police (MSP) is a full-service law enforcement agency, with approximately 3,000 employees who provide over 60 different services either directly to Michigan residents or in support of other law enforcement agencies. The MSP personnel most visible to the public are the uniform troopers of the Field Services Bureau whose primary responsibilities include investigating crimes, deterring criminal activity, apprehending criminals and fugitives, conducting traffic enforcement to increase traffic safety, and participating in community outreach and prevention services activities. The MSP also has a cadre of highly trained detectives who conduct investigations in specialized fields such as homicides, fraud, felonious assault, computer crimes, fire investigation and criminal sexual conduct.

The MSP has a variety of specialized teams that each receive advanced training and equipment and are available to provide direct service or to assist other law enforcement agencies. These teams include the Bomb Squad, Canine Unit, Marine Services Team, Aviation Unit, Emergency Support Team, Motor Unit and Tactical Bike Team. The MSP also provides leadership for over 20 multijurisdictional teams in areas including narcotics, auto theft, computer crimes and cold cases. In addition, MSP motor carrier officers perform commercial motor vehicle enforcement and truck safety initiatives statewide.

The MSP provides 24-hour, forensic science services from eight regional laboratories to all police agencies in the state. Each laboratory meets the Federal Bureau of Investigation’s Quality Assurance Standards and is accredited by the American National Standards Institute-American Society of Quality (ANSI-ASQ) National Accreditation Board.

The MSP is the repository for criminal justice records including criminal history records, traffic crash records, firearms records, concealed pistol registrations, sex offender registry, missing persons, stolen property, mug shots and fingerprints. The department  makes use  of Michigan Residents Directory Database and other similar public records meant for the state. The department also administers the Law Enforcement Information Network (LEIN) to provide criminal justice agencies access to this information. In addition, the MSP uses Michigan Incident Crime Reporting to prepare the annual Uniform Crime Report that provides both a local-level and statewide description of crime in Michigan.

Michigan’s Homeland Security Advisor is the Michigan State Police Director, who is responsible for protecting Michigan’s citizens, its critical infrastructure and key resources, and responding to attacks, incidents and natural disasters that occur in Michigan. The State Emergency Operations Center (SEOC) is managed and maintained by the Michigan State Police, Emergency Management and Homeland Security Division. The SEOC is responsible for facilitating the coordination of all state agency activities and resources during an emergency or disaster ensuring an effective and efficient state response. During activation of the SEOC, personnel monitor ongoing incidents, communicate with affected jurisdictions and government agencies, as well as assess and coordinate any requests for state resources or assistance. The SEOC is typically staffed by state agency personnel, nonprofit organizations, as well as members of the private sector affected by the incident. The Governor is kept informed of state response and recovery activities from the SEOC.

In addition to helping local governments plan and prepare for both man-made and natural disasters, the MSP coordinates state and federal resources to assist local jurisdictions with response and relief activities in the event of an emergency or disaster. The MSP coordinates all state-level homeland security initiatives and serves as the State Administrative Agency for federal homeland security grants.

The MSP Training Academy located in Dimondale provides learning opportunities and training programs for both MSP employees and the broader criminal justice community in areas such as leadership development, narcotics investigation, pursuit driving, first aid, marksmanship and Michigan law. The MSP’s Precision Driving Unit is internationally recognized for its annual Police Vehicle Evaluation program.

Agencies housed within the MSP include the Auto Theft Prevention Authority, Michigan Commission on Law Enforcement Standards and Michigan Office of Highway Safety Planning.

Patrol vehicles

Vehicle types
The familiar blue MSP Patrol Car is referred to as "the blue goose" by members of the department. The department's fleet consists of the Dodge Charger, the Chevrolet Tahoe Special Service Vehicle, and the Ford Police Utility SUV. MSP has now retired the Crown Victoria Police Interceptor from their fleet.

Several other varieties of vehicles, including Chevrolet Suburbans and Impalas, are used by the department's specialized divisions. MSP also deploys troopers on Harley Davidson and BMW R1200RT-P motorcycles. Michigan State Police choose their vehicles using a weighted formula and results from their annual vehicle evaluation tests.

Paint color and marking styles

The distinctive blue paint color used on Michigan State Police vehicles is one of the few law enforcement vehicle special order (VSO) colors that manufacturers add to their color palette specifically for an agency.  Per Michigan State Police specifications, the color is the "same as Dulux 93-032" (and which may be identified by other color designations or codes depending on whether Ford, GM, or Chrysler produced the vehicle to which the paint is applied). MSP is fairly unusual in its use of both the blue paint of the patrol cars and the red hue of the rotating overhead light as basic livery; the department has used the blue paint scheme and the current door decals since 1954.

The MSP also utilizes "slick top" patrol units for traffic enforcement. There are two types of traffic cars:  the traditional blue patrol car minus the traditional "gumball" light, and a semi-marked variety that is painted in colors other than blue and marked only on the passenger side. Available in tan, red, white, silver, and black, these units also use hidden LED lights to increase their effectiveness and have been extremely successful. 

MSP Motor Carrier Enforcement officers of the Commercial Vehicle Enforcement Division (CVED) who enforce truck safety laws, drive vehicles identical to regular MSP patrol vehicles, except that they have a "Commercial Vehicle Enforcement" designation on the rear quarter panels of the unit in gold lettering. CVED currently uses only the Chevrolet Tahoe. Starting in 2008, CVED moved to the Tahoe platform and began using the same paint scheme as the Troopers' vehicle. The words "Commercial Vehicle Enforcement" were added to the quarter panels and the 'Motor Carrier Enforcement' decals on the rear were replaced with standard "State Police" decals.

Unique lighting
Fully marked patrol vehicles feature a single red overhead light, the RV-26 or RV-46 "Spitfire" made by Unity Manufacturing that rotates when activated; however, in late 2009, MSP announced that these are being retrofitted with red LED lamps rather than incandescent beams to reduce the hassle and expense of replacing the PAR 36 or PAR 46, 60,000 CP sealed beam bulbs and servicing the rotor motors. Red lenses on some MSP vehicle roof beacons have one or two clear horizontal stripes that allow some white light to shine through, giving the lamps a pinkish glow at long distances. Michigan State Police have continued to use the "gumball" style lights instead of lightbars, claiming they are unique, reduce wind drag, and are highly visible at long distances.

MSP vehicles also feature a clear plastic sign, referred to as a "hood light" or "hailer" or "shark fin" on the hood that lights up when activated. The historical use of this hood light dates from the time when a "side stop" patrol stop would be initiated by pulling up next to an offender and the Trooper would motion them to pull over in daylight; at night the hood light was illuminated displaying the words "State Police" and "STOP" (MSP no longer use the "side stop").

Patrol units also use red and blue LEDs facing to the rear of the vehicle and in some forward facing push bumpers, as well as headlight and tail light flashers. Both the rotating overhead light and the hood light have traditionally been synonymous with the MSP. The rotating red light has been used by the MSP since the 1950's and the current style red overhead light has been in use by the agency since 1979. The red overhead lights on some MSP cars are 25–30 years old.

Vehicle testing
Michigan State Police is one of only two agencies in North America (the other being the Los Angeles County Sheriff's Department) that conduct annual tests of police and special services vehicles. MSP typically conducts their top speed and braking tests each fall at Chrysler Proving Grounds in Chelsea, Michigan and vehicle dynamics and handling tests on the road course at Grattan Raceway in Grattan Township, Michigan. Tests are open to members of the law enforcement community, fleet managers, and other interested parties, and results are published for the benefit of the law enforcement community.

Many of the specifications and option offerings for Chrysler, Ford, GM police vehicles are a result of findings and suggestions stemming from MSP evaluations. Annual test results are published at the MSP Website

Aviation Unit

The five aircraft in the Michigan State Police Aviation Unit are assigned several duties:
search and rescue
relays
traffic enforcement
traffic control
security
training
investigative and administrative flights

Mobile Command Vehicle
The Michigan State Police operates one Mobile Command Vehicle as of 2006. The  vehicle has an International chassis and engine and weighs . It is equipped with GPS, satellite television, a diesel electric generator, and a lavatory.

The vehicle is also equipped with a variety of radio systems that allow those operating it to communicate effectively in the field. The vehicle was utilized during Hurricane Katrina relief in September 2005 and is also frequently used at large events throughout the state.

Miscellaneous information

The department's value statement is: A PROUD tradition of SERVICE through EXCELLENCE, INTEGRITY, and COURTESY. The department requires that the emphasized words be shown in capitalized print when the statement is reproduced in any fashion.

The department's work sites are called "Posts," much as a local police department's offices are referred to as "stations." Many MSP posts are similarly designed and feature a distinctive two-story architectural style with a front door centered above exterior steps to the first level and a sandstone center section engraved with the state seal and the words "Michigan State Police". Many of these buildings were built in the 1930s in the years following The Great Depression just before World War II.

To date, 53 Michigan State Police Troopers have died in the line of duty.

As of January 2019, the Director of the MSP is Colonel Joseph Gasper. He was appointed to the position of Director by Governor Gretchen Whitmer and was preceded by Col. Kriste Kibbey Etue.

Recruits must complete an intensive twenty-six week training academy prior to being confirmed as a Trooper. The paramilitaristic, residential school is held at the MSP Training Academy in Lansing, MI.

Troopers are issued the Glock 17 Gen 5 9mm handgun for their sidearm.

Budget 

The State Police Budget for 2009-2010 fiscal year is US$527.3 million, an increase of 5.5 million from the previous year. For the 2018-19 fiscal year, the MSP had a budget of $738.1 million.  For the 2020-21 fiscal year, the governor recommended a budget of $735.6 million.

The removed section contains untrue information.  The linked articles to not reference troopers of the Michigan State Police.

Department rank structure
The MSP uses a paramilitary ranking system, as follows (from highest to lowest rankings):

Demographics
The demographics of the Michigan State Police force, as of March 2015:

Male: 91.7%
Female: 8.3%
White: 84%
African-American/Black: 6.1%
Hispanic: 3%
Native American: 2%

See also

 List of law enforcement agencies in Michigan
 Michigan Department of State Police v. Sitz
 Will v. Michigan Department of State Police
General:
 State police
 State patrol
 Highway patrol

References

External links

Fallen Officers of the Michigan State Police
MSP Post locations and district boundaries as of March 27, 2013
Connect With Us on Social Media
MSP post coverage by county as of April 2020

State law enforcement agencies of Michigan
Government agencies established in 1917
1917 establishments in Michigan